PyCharm is an integrated development environment (IDE) used for programming in Python. It provides code analysis, a graphical debugger, an integrated unit tester, integration with version control systems, and supports web development with Django. PyCharm is developed by the Czech company JetBrains.

It is cross-platform, working on Microsoft Windows, macOS and Linux. PyCharm has a Professional Edition, released under a proprietary license  and a Community Edition released under the Apache License. PyCharm Community Edition is less extensive than the Professional Edition.

Features

Coding assistance and analysis, with code completion, syntax and error highlighting, linter integration, and quick fixes
Project and code navigation: specialized project views, file structure views and quick jumping between files, classes, methods and usages
Python code refactoring: including rename, extract method, introduce variable, introduce constant, pull up, push down and others
Support for web frameworks: Django, web2py and Flask
Integrated Python debugger
Integrated unit testing, with line-by-line coverage
Google App Engine Python development
Version control integration: unified user interface for Mercurial, Git, Subversion, Perforce and CVS with changelists and merge
Scientific tools integration: integrates with IPython Notebook, has an interactive Python console, and supports Anaconda as well as multiple scientific packages including Matplotlib and NumPy.

History
PyCharm was released to the market of the Python-focused IDEs to compete with PyDev (for Eclipse)  or the more broadly focused Komodo IDE by ActiveState.

The beta version of the product was released in July 2010, with the 1.0 arriving 3 months later. Version 2.0 was released on 13 December 2011, version 3.0 was released on 24 September 2013, and version 4.0 was released on November 19, 2014.

PyCharm became Open Source on 22 October 2013. The Open Source variant is released under the name Community Edition–while the commercial variant, Professional Edition, contains closed-source modules.

Licensing
 PyCharm Professional Edition is free for open source projects and for some educational uses. There is also an Academic license which is discounted for other educational use.
 PyCharm Community Edition is distributed under Apache 2 license. The source code is available on GitHub.

See also
 Comparison of Python integrated development environments
 GitHub Copilot
 List of Python software

References

External links
 

Integrated development environments
Linux integrated development environments
Formerly proprietary software
Linux programming tools
Software development kits
Software using the Apache license